KCEP may refer to:

KCEP (FM), a radio station (88.1 FM) licensed to Las Vegas, Nevada, United States
Kansas City Equity Partners, an investment company
Kaplan, Inc. Certified Education Provider